Suchen Christine Lim (born 1948) is a Malaysian-born Singaporean writer. She was the inaugural winner of the Singapore Literature Prize in 1992.

Early life 
Lim was born in Ipoh, Federation of Malaya and had her early education at the Convent of the Holy Infant Jesus (CHIJ) in Penang and Kedah. At the age of 14 she came to Singapore, and continued her education at CHIJ Katong. She read literature at the National University of Singapore, and graduated with a post-graduate diploma in applied linguistics. After her graduation, Lim joined the Ministry of Education as a curriculum specialist, and devoted her time between family, work and writing throughout her years with the ministry.

Career 
Lim's first story The Valley of Golden Showers was written in 1979 for a children's story competition. A year later, Lim entered another writing competition sponsored by the National Book Council, winning second place. These competitions sparked her interest in becoming a writer.

Lim's first novel Rice Bowl was published in 1984, and she co-wrote the award-winning short play The Amah: A Portrait in Black And White in 1986. Her second novel Gift From The Gods (1990) was nominated for a National Book Development Council award in 1992. In that same year, Lim won the inaugural Singapore Literature Prize for her third novel Fistful of Colours (1992). A Bit of Earth (2000) was nominated for the Singapore Literature Prize in 2004. In 1996 she was given a Fulbright Grant to attend the prestigious Iowa Writers' Workshop, and returned to the university as writer-in-residence in 2000. This residency honour was also extended to her at the University of Western Australia in Perth, the Moniack Mhor Writers' Centre in the Scottish Highlands and Ateneo de Manila University in the Philippines.

Lim retired from the Ministry of Education in August 2003, to devote her time to writing. That devotion subsequently bore fruit in the novels published as Hua Song: Stories of the Chinese Diaspora (2005) and The Lies that Build a Marriage: Stories of the Unsung, Unsaid and Uncelebrated in Singapore (2007).

In 2015, The Straits Times''' Akshita Nanda selected Fistful of Colours as one of 10 classic Singapore novels. She wrote, "The gorgeously detailed A Fistful of Colours by Suchen Christine Lim covers art and women's fight for equal rights over 80 years of Singapore history. The winner of the first Singapore Literature Prize in 1992, it is a fist to the gut with its relentless portrayal of female struggles for power in a patriarchal society that strips women of any right to their sexuality or dignity."

 Works 

Novels
 Dearest Intimate (2022, Marshall Cavendish Editions) 
 The River's Song (2014, Aurora Metro Press) 
 A Bit of Earth (2001, Times Books International; 2009, Marshall Cavendish Editions) 
 Fistful of Colours (1992, EPB Publishers; 2003, SNP Editions) 
 Gift from the Gods (1990, G. Brash) 
 Rice Bowl (1984, Times Books International; 2009, Marshall Cavendish Editions)  

Short stories
 The Man Who Wore His Wife's Sarong: Stories of the Unsung, Unsaid and Uncelebrated in Singapore (2017, Monsoon Books) 
 The Lies that Build a Marriage: Stories of the Unsung, Unsaid and Uncelebrated in Singapore (2007, Monsoon Books) 

Non-fiction
 Hua Song: Stories of the Chinese Diaspora (2005, Long River Press) 

Children's
 Fried Eggs (2014, Ethos Books) 
 I Don't Want to Dance (2011, Ethos Books) 
 Miss Missy Mynah (2011, Ethos Books) 
 My New Monster Truck (2009, Ethos Books) 
 The Hare and the Tortoise (1992, Manhattan Press) 
 The River People (1992, Manhattan Press) 
 The Biggest Hongbao in the Whole Wide World (1991, EPB Publishers; 2009, EPB Pan Pacific)  
 Cheep Cheep Cheep (1990, EPB Publishers, 2009, EPB Pan Pacific)  
 Granny (1991, EPB Publishers; 2009, EPB Pan Pacific)  
 Grandpa the Collector (1991, EPB Publishers; 2009, EPB Pan Pacific)  
 Nanny Nanny Poo Poo (1991, EPB Publishers; 2009, EPB Pan Pacific)  
 Mano Made A Promise (1991, EPB Publishers; 2009, EPB Pan Pacific)  
 Roti Prata (1991, EPB Publishers; 2009, EPB Pan Pacific)  
 Woo Won Ton (1991, EPB Publishers; 2009, EPB Pan Pacific)  
 When My Baby Sister Came Home (1990, EPB Publishers) 
 Ants in a Hurry (1990, EPB Publishers) 
 Julius Fatball and the Alley Cats (1990, EPB Publishers; 2009, EPB Pan Pacific)  
 The Hatching (1990, EPB Publishers) 
 The Valley of Golden Showers (1979, Educational Publications Bureau)

Others
 The Amah: a Portrait in Black and White'' (1986, short play)

See also 
 Literature of Singapore

References

External links
Suchen Christine Lim webpage

"Multiracial Clans in Colorful Malaya" by Christopher B. Patterson

Living people
1948 births
Singaporean writers
Singaporean people of Hakka descent
Malaysian emigrants to Singapore
People who lost Malaysian citizenship
Naturalised citizens of Singapore
S.E.A. Write Award winners
Singaporean non-fiction writers
Singaporean novelists
Singapore Literature Prize winners
National University of Singapore alumni
International Writing Program alumni